Zhang Jun (born 20 July 1998) is a Chinese racewalking athlete. He qualified to represent China at the 2020 Summer Olympics in Tokyo 2021, competing in men's 20 kilometres walk.

References

External links
 

 

1998 births
Living people
Chinese male racewalkers
Athletes (track and field) at the 2020 Summer Olympics
Olympic athletes of China